Horodnic de Jos is a commune in Suceava County, Bukovina, northeastern Romania. It is composed of a single village, namely Horodnic de Jos. From 1950 to 2003, under the name of Horodnic commune, it included Horodnic de Sus village; that was then split off to form a separate commune, and Horodnic was renamed Horodnic de Jos.

Natives 

 Dimitrie Prelipcean (1927–1987), writer
 Ion G. Sbiera (1836–1916), writer

References 

Communes in Suceava County
Localities in Southern Bukovina